Endo-alpha-N-acetylgalactosaminidase may refer to:
 Mucinaminylserine mucinaminidase, an enzyme
 Glycopeptide alpha-N-acetylgalactosaminidase, an enzyme